Rajib Ghosh (born 12 July 1989) is an Indian professional footballer who last played as a defender for Calcutta Premier Division side Bhawanipore. He also represented West Bengal in Santosh Trophy, winning the 2009–10 season.

Club career

Early career
Born in West Bengal, Ghosh started playing football very early, when he was 6–7 years old. He played Nursery League for the Avenue Lake Gardens team, where they finished runners-up. He played as a midfielder in that tournament.

After that stint, he joined Ballygunge AC, a 5th Division team in Kolkata where he played as a stopper. He then switched over to Milan Samity next season, where he played for two years. There also he played in centre-back.

He then moved to Kidderpore, where he spent two seasons. He played both as right back as well as defensive midfielder in that team. In his second season in Khidirpur (2005–06), they reached the Super Division (now Premier Division).

Ghosh first played in the CFL Premier Division during 2006–07 season, when he joined Calcutta Port Trust. The team was managed by Alok Mukherjee, who used him as left back. He got an offer to play for Mohammedan Sporting After that season, he got offer from Mohun Bagan and Salgaocar, but he had to stay in Mohammedan since he had two more years on his contract with them.

After that, he spent a year with East Bengal.

Dhaka Mohammedan
In 2009, Ghosh moved to Bangladesh and joined Premier League side Mohammedan Sporting Dhaka. He played there until 2010, before signing with Mohun Bagan.

Pailan Arrows
After his stint in Mohammedan, Ghosh joined Pailan Arrows in 2011. They played under the coaching of Sukhwinder Singh. Pailan participated in the 2011 Indian Federation Cup and finished second in group stages behind Salgaocar. They then began their 2011–12 I-League campaign against Mohun Bagan at the Salt Lake Stadium on 23 October 2012 in which they lost 1–3. Towards the end of the season, Pailan managed to win two matches, one against Chirag United Club Kerala and another against HAL to finished the season in 13th place out of 14 teams and were not relegated being a developmental team.

Mohun Bagan
Ghosh signed for Mohun Bagan AC of the I-League on 14 May 2012. He played only 2 matches.

Bhawanipore
In 2013, he moved to Calcutta Football League side Bhawanipore. In the I-League 2nd Division, the club achieved runners-up finish in 2014–15, with 17 points in 8 matches. They later achieved third place in 2012–13.

West Bengal
Ghosh also appeared with the West Bengal team in the 46th edition (2009–10 season) of Santosh Trophy. In the final on 8 August 2010, they clinched the title edging past Punjab 2–1 at the Vivekananda Yuba Bharati Krirangan.

International career
While Rajib was in Mohammedan Sporting, Colin Toal called him to the India U19 national camp in Goa. He was also part of the team that participated in 2008 AFC Youth Championship qualification, where he appeared in five matches.

Career statistics

Club
Statistics accurate as of 1 June 2013

Honours
Mohun Bagan
 Federation Cup runner-up: 2010

West Bengal
Santosh Trophy: 2009–10

See also

 List of Indian football players in foreign leagues

References

External links
 
 

Indian footballers
1989 births
Living people
Footballers from West Bengal
I-League players
Mohammedan SC (Kolkata) players
East Bengal Club players
Indian Arrows players
Mohun Bagan AC players
Indian expatriate footballers
Expatriate footballers in Bangladesh
Association football defenders
Mohammedan SC (Dhaka) players